The Potez 840 was a 1960s French four-engined 18-passenger executive monoplane, the last aircraft to use the Potez name.

Development
The Potez 840 was an all-metal cantilever-wing monoplane with a retractable tricycle landing gear. It had a crew of three and a cabin for 18 passengers. It was powered by four 440 shp (328 kW) Turbomeca Astazou II turboprop engines. The prototype first flew on 29 April 1961; a second aircraft flew in June 1962 and had more powerful 600 shp (447 kW) Turbomeca Astazou XII engines. The second prototype carried out a sales tour of North America and it was planned to build a batch of 25 aircraft for Chicago-based Turbo Flight Inc. but only two more prototype aircraft were built, one for static testing. The next two aircraft were designated the Potez 841 and were powered by 550 shp (417 kW) Pratt & Whitney Canada PT6A-6 turboprop engines. Another two modified Astazou-powered aircraft were produced, one in 1965 and one in 1967.

It was intended to build Potez 840s in a factory at Baldonnel Aerodrome in the Republic of Ireland with financial aid from the Government of Ireland but this factory was closed in 1968 without completing a single aircraft. The former Potez factory at Baldonnel became an engine maintenance facility for the German airline Lufthansa with the factory finally closing in 2013.

Service
The two Potez 841s were delivered to German customers in 1965, remaining in use until the mid 1970s. The first Potez 842 was operated by the French national civil pilot training school, Service de la Formation Aéronautique (SFA) from 1966 to 1976, while the second 842 was purchased by the Moroccan Ministry of Defense, being sold on in 1978.

Variants
Potez 840
Astazou-powered variant, four built.
Potez 841
Production variant powered by  Pratt & Whitney PT6A-6 engines, two built.
Potez 842
Production variant powered by  Turbomeca Astazou XII engines, two built.
Potez 843
 Unbuilt 1965 proposal with deeper fuselage and PT6 engines.
Potez 880
Unbuilt military STOL version with four  Turbomeca Bastan engines.
Potez 881
Unbuilt civil version of 880.

Survivors
 One aircraft is displayed at the Musée de l’air et de l’espace in Paris.
 The intact fuselage of a second is in the Shetland Islands. It suffered a wheels-up landing at Sumburgh Airport in 1981. Many years later the fuselage was recovered and moved to its current location at North Roe in 2007.

Specifications (Potez 842)

See also

References

Notes

Bibliography

 

 

1960s French civil utility aircraft
840
Four-engined tractor aircraft
Four-engined turboprop aircraft
Low-wing aircraft
1960s French business aircraft
Aircraft first flown in 1961